Kiririsha (Elamite: “great lady”) was a major goddess worshiped in Elam.

Early scholarship incorrectly identified her as one and the same as Pinikir, an unrelated goddess from a different part of Elam.

Character
Kiririsha is regarded as one of the most prominent Elamite deities by modern researchers.  Elamite texts refer to her as “mother of gods.”

An inscription of Hanni of Ayapir from the neo-Elamite period describes her, Napirisha and Tepti as gods “who have always protected water and earth” or “who have let thrive water and earth.” As Napirisha’s association with water is well attested, Wouter Henkelman proposes that Kirirsha could possibly be connected to earth, and that she is the deity whose name is only represented by the logogram KI (“earth” in Sumerian) in the Persepolis fortification archive.

Kiririsha additionally also had a presently unclear association with death, as indicated by her epithet zana Liyan lahakara, “lady of the death at Liyan.” Multiple other Elamite deities were referred to as lahakara (“of death”), including Inshushinak and the goddess Upurkubak. It has been proposed that certain religious structures, namely monumental gates and so-called siyan husame (“temple in a grove”) were related to a deity’s underworld-related character in Elam, but this theory is disputed. Excavations in the proximity of Bushehr in Iran, near the site of ancient Liyan, revealed the existence of a custom involving “burials” of palm trees, which has been tentatively linked to the cult of Kiririsha by researchers.

Association with other deities
Napirisha and Kirisha are regarded as consorts in Elamite texts.  It has been proposed that they might be the divine couple represented on reliefs from Kurangun and Naqsh-e Rostam.

Kiririsha and Napirisha were commonly grouped with Inshushinak in inscriptions, leading some researchers to propose that they were understood as a trinity in the Elamite pantheon. Milan Jahamgirfar notes that Elamite groupings of deities varied between specific areas, but nonetheless tentatively  accepts the view that Inshushinak, Napirisha and Kirisha constituted a triad in the national pantheon.

The god Hutran, who originated in Awan, was regarded as a son of Kiririsha and Napirisha.

Worship

Kiririsha was most likely the tutelary goddess of Liyan, where she is attested as early as in the 19th century BCE. She was also an important member of the pantheon of Anshan. Her worship spread to various locations in the Elamite highlands in the late Middle Elamite period.

King Humban-Numena built a temple dedicated to her in Liyan. It was later restored by Shutruk-Nakhunte as well as Kutir-Nahhunte.

Inscriptions from the reign of Untash-Napirisha indicate new statues and temples of Kiririsha were created during that period. One of her temples was a part of the Chogha Zanbil complex. Numerous artifacts inscribed with the name of Untash-Napirisha have been recovered from it, including various weapons (ax and mace heads, swords and daggers), small animal figures and jewelry. She is also mentioned, alongside Napirisha and Inshushinak, in a curse inscribed on the statue of Napir-Asu, assumed to be the king’s principal wife and daughter of Kassite king Burna-Buriash II.

Yet another temple dedicated to Kiririsha, shared with Napirisha, Inshushinak and Simut, existed in Anshan. It was built during the reign of Hutelutush-Inshushinak.

The stele of Shilhak-Inshushinak invokes Napirisha, Kiririsha, Inshushinak and Humban, followed by 7 more deities.

Kiririsha continued to be revered in the neo-Elamite period in Susa and in Ayapir (modern Izeh). Hanni of Ayapir mentioned Kiririsha in a curse formula alongside Napirisha and Tepti.

Disproved theories
Walther Hinz, an early researcher of Elam, believed that Kiririsha was not a distinct goddess, but merely a “taboo name” of Pinikir. The theory of Elamite divine  "taboo names" in general and specifically of the alleged equivalence between Kiririsha and Pinikir (and between Humban and Napirisha) is considered discredited by modern researchers of Elamite religion such as Wouter Henkelman and François Vallat. Kiririsha and Pinikir have their origin in pantheons of different parts of Elam (Liyan and Awan, respectively), were worshiped separately at Chogha Zanbil, and both appear in an inscription accompanying a bronze relief from Susa. Additionally, while Pinikir is compared both in ancient texts and in modern scholarship to Ishtar and Ninsianna, Kiririsha is instead regarded as similar to Ninhursag.

The view that Kiririsha and Pinikir were one deity, pioneered by Hinz, lead to the formation of a theory that the latter was a mother goddess like her. However, the title “mother of gods” associated with Kiririsha is only attested for the goddess Mashti from Malamir otherwise.

Another of Hinz’s proposals regarded as doubtful today is the theory that Kiririsha was the consort of both Napirisha and Inshushinak at once.

References

Bibliography 

Elamite goddesses